Jin Midi (134–86 BC) (courtesy name Wengshu (翁叔), formally Marquess Jing of Du (秺敬侯), was a foreign prince and a warrior of the Western Han Dynasty. He was a Hu (胡) "barbarian" from a kingdom in central Gansu area and served as coregent early in the reign of Emperor Zhao of Han.

Background 
Jin Midi was born in 134 BC to a Xiongnu allied royal family probably of Greco-Bactrian origins ruling central Gansu. He was the heir of the king Xiutu (休屠王; Soter/Σωτήρ), one of the major kings serving under the supreme ruler of the Xiongnu, Gunchen Chanyu.  After Gunchen's death in 126 BC, his brother Yizhixie succeeded him.  During this time, the king of Xiutu and another major king, the king Hunxie, were assigned for defending Xiongnu's southwestern border against the Han Dynasty – in modern central and western Gansu.

In 121 BC, Emperor Wu of Han sent his general Huo Qubing to attack Xiongnu armies, dealing a great defeat on the Xiongnus and their Greco-Bactrian and Irano-Scythian allies in Gansu.  In the campaign, Huo killed the kings Zhelan (折蘭王) and Luhu (盧胡王), as well as 8,000 Xiongnu and Hu (胡) allied horsemen warriors, while capturing the king of Xiutu's son, general, and a number of officials, as well as the golden statue (believed to be Buddha but also argued to be that of Zeus, and associated with the twelve chryselephantine statues captured a hundred years earlier in Gansu by Qinshi Huangdi) of king Xiutu to worship Heaven (祭天金人) Yizhixie Chanyu was greatly displeased, and was considering killing the kings Hunxie and Xiutu.  The two kings, in fear, plotted to defect to the Han.  When Emperor Wu sent Huo to accept their surrender, the king Xiutu changed his mind and tried to back out of defecting.  The king Hunxie killed him and surrendered to the Han, along with the last Euthydemid Greco-Saka kingdom of Central Gansu area.

Because the king of Xiutu was murdered, fourteen years old Midi (Demetrios), as well as his mother the queen, and his brother Leon (λέων), "Lun" (倫), were taken as exotic guests at the imperial palace.

During Emperor Wu's reign 
On a later occasion, during an imperial feast, Emperor Wu ordered that horses be brought to him for him to examine.  Midi, and a large number of fellow stable attendants, brought the horses, and as a number of Emperor Wu's beautiful concubines were in attendance, the attendants were struck by their beauty and were looking at them, but Midi did not dare to.  Emperor Wu saw Midi and was impressed by his propriety, tall stature, and how healthy and strong the horses under Midi's care were.  That same day, he awarded Midi robes and made him the director of the imperial stables, and thereafter became increasingly close to Midi.  As he remembered that the king Xiutu had used golden statues to worship heaven, Emperor Wu gave Midi the surname Jin, meaning "gold."  When Jin Midi's mother died, Emperor Wu had her portrait drawn and displayed at his later favorite palace, Sweet Springs Palace, entitling the portrait, "The queen of Xiutu" (i.e., not regarding her as a servant any more, but by her former status as princess).  Two of Jin Midi's sons became close attendants to Emperor Wu and were favored by Emperor Wu.  After one of the sons was grown, on one occasion, he was flirting with Emperor Wu's ladies in waiting when Jin Midi saw them.  Jin Midi, in anger that his son's behavior was inappropriate, killed him, and then reported to Emperor Wu.  Emperor Wu was greatly saddened but became even more impressed with Jin Midi.

In 88 BC, the imperial official Ma Heluo (馬何羅) was anxious over the fact that the clan of his friend Jiang Chong (江充) had been slaughtered by Emperor Wu.  Jiang had falsely accused Emperor Wu's crown prince Liu Ju of treason in 91 BC, causing Liu Ju to rise in rebellion in fear, killing Jiang.  Liu Ju was killed, but in the aftermath, Emperor Wu, discovering that Jiang's accusations were false, had Jiang's clan slaughtered.  He thus conspired with his brothers to assassinate Emperor Wu.  The assassination attempt was thwarted by Midi, as when he saw Ma about to enter Emperor Wu's bedchambers with a knife, he grabbed Ma by the neck in a wrestling technique, and had thrown him to the ground.

In 87 BC, Emperor Wu was seriously ill, and he created his youngest son Liu Fuling crown prince.  He summoned his close associates to his bedchambers to designate one of them, Huo Qubing's younger brother Huo Guang, as regent.  Huo initially declined, arguing that Midi was more capable, but Midi pointed out that he was ethnically a Hu, and that the other officials and the Xiongnu might think of him lightly.  Emperor Wu thus designated Huo as the primary regent, but also designated Midi and Shangguan Jie secondary regents.  He soon died, and Liu Fuling took the throne as Emperor Zhao.  (In his will, Emperor Wu, citing the suppression of Ma's plot, created Midi, as well as Huo and Shangguan, marquesses, but Midi, citing Emperor Zhao's young age, declined.)

During Emperor Zhao's reign 
In fall 86 BC, Jin Midi became seriously ill.  Huo Guang, after discussing with Emperor Zhao, had Emperor Zhao approve a creation of Midi as the Marquess of Du on his bed.  Midi died the next day and was buried near Emperor Wu's tomb.  His family continued to serve as imperial servants until the end of the Western Han Dynasty, with seven generations in total.

See also
 Emperor Zhao of Han
 Huo Guang
 Xiongnu

References

Sources 
金日磾 
武威本土历史人物——金日磾  
 Book of Han, vol. 68.
 Zizhi Tongjian, vols. 19, 20, 21, 22, 23.
 Han Ji, vols. 13, 15, 16 .
 祭天金人 
 休屠王 

134 BC births
86 BC deaths
Han dynasty politicians
Regents of China
Xiongnu